Marie may refer to:

People

Name
 Marie (given name)
 Marie (Japanese given name)
 Marie (murder victim), girl who was killed in Florida after being pushed in front of a moving vehicle in 1973
 Marie (died 1759), an enslaved Cree person in Trois-Rivières, New France
 Marie, Biblical reference to Holy Mary, mother of Jesus
 Marie Curie,  scientist

Surname
 Jean Gabriel Marie (disambiguation)
 Peter Marié (1826–1903), American socialite from New York City, philanthropist, and collector of rare books and miniatures
 Rose Marie (1923–2017), American actress and singer
 Teena Marie (1956–2010), American singer, songwriter, and producer

Places
 Marie, Alpes-Maritimes, commune of the Alpes-Maritimes department, France
 Lake Marie, Umpqua Lighthouse State Park, Winchester Bay, Oregon, U.S.
 Marie, Arkansas, U.S.
 Marie, West Virginia, U.S.

Art, entertainment, and media

Music
 "Marie" (Cat Mother and the All Night Newsboys song), 1969
 "Marie" (Johnny Hallyday song), 2002
 "Marie", a song written by Irving Berlin that was a hit for Tommy Dorsey, Rudy Vallée, Nat Shilkret, Franklyn Bauer, The Four Tunes, and The Bachelors
 Marie, a 2008 EP by the band Romance of Young Tigers
 "Marie", a song by Townes Van Zandt, popularized by Willie Nelson
 "Marie", a song by The Cockroaches, Album By Hey What Now!

Television
 Marie (1980 TV series), an American television show
 Marie (talk show), a talk show hosted by Marie Osmond
 Marie (TV pilot), a 1979 American television pilot

Other art, entertainment, and media 
 Marie (1985 film), a 1985 American film  directed by Roger Donaldson
 Marie (novel), a 1912 novel by H. Rider Haggard featuring Allan Quatermain
 Atelier Marie, the first game in the Atelier series
 Marie, a 2009 ballet produced by Houston Ballet under the artistic direction of Stanton Welch
 Marie (2020 film), a documentary short film about labor during homebirths
 Marie, a fictional Turkish Angora kitten from The Aristocats
 Marie Kanker, a fictional Kathleen Barr Cartoon from Ed, Edd n Eddy by Danny Antonucci

Ships
 , a number of steamships with this name
 , the name of more than one United States Navy ship

Other
 Marie, Queen of Rodrigues, a statue of the Virgin Mary in Port Mathurin
 Marie biscuit, a type of sweet biscuit
 Mars Radiation Environment Experiment (MARIE), spacecraft instrument

See also
 Maria (disambiguation)
 Marie Antoinette (disambiguation)
 Mariya, a given name
 Mary (disambiguation)
 Saint Marie (disambiguation)
 Sainte-Marie (disambiguation)